Eois anisorrhopa is a moth in the family Geometridae. It is found on Madagascar.

References

Moths described in 1933
Eois
Moths of Madagascar
Moths of Africa